The 7 O'Clock News is a British news programme. It was the main news programme broadcast each weekday at 7:00pm, on British digital television channel BBC Three between 9 February 2003 to 2 December 2005. Originally called The News Show from the launch of BBC Three on 9 February 2003, it was rebranded later in the year, though retaining the same presentation team.

Format

Compared to the rest of the BBC News output, The 7 O'Clock News had a completely different image and style of presentation, with a turquoise colour scheme in contrast to the standard red and black. Presenters began bulletins standing but ended seated, reviewing the newspapers towards the end of the programme.

Presenters

Julian Worricker (2003)
Sangita Myska (2003–2004)
Tazeen Ahmad (2003–2005)
Eddie Mair (2004–2005)
Sevan Bastajian (2003–2005)
Ben McCarthy (2003–2005)
 Paddy O'Connell (2004–2005)

Axing

On 21 October 2005, the BBC announced that it was ending The 7 O'Clock News, but continuing with the 60 Seconds bulletins, opting to fill the slot, which is immediately after BBC Three comes on air, with "high quality factual programming". Although the show was a cornerstone of the bid to start BBC Three, a report into the BBC's digital output claimed that the show "achieves nothing and attracts tiny audiences", and so the controller of the channel, Stuart Murphy took the step of terminating the show.

See also 

 BBC News

References 

BBC television news shows
2003 British television series debuts
2005 British television series endings